Shelby Township is one of eleven townships in Ripley County, Indiana. As of the 2010 census, its population was 999 and it contained 387 housing units.

History
Collin's Ford Bridge, Marble Creek Bridge, and Old Timbers in the Big Oaks National Wildlife Refuge are listed on the National Register of Historic Places.

Geography

Unincorporated towns
 Haney Corner
 Jolleyville
 New Carrollton
 New Marion
 Rexville

Extinct town
 Saint Magdalen

References

External links
 Indiana Township Association
 United Township Association of Indiana

Townships in Ripley County, Indiana
Townships in Indiana